A gluten-free casein-free diet (GFCF diet), also known as a gluten-free dairy-free diet (GFDF diet), is a diet that does not include gluten (found most often in wheat, barley, and rye), and casein (found most often in milk and dairy products). Despite an absence of scientific evidence, there have been advocates for the use of this diet as a treatment for autism and related conditions.

Uses

Autism
The majority of the available evidence does not support the use of this diet in the treatment of autism.

 American Academy of Pediatrics – Clinical Report (2007) In their report, the AAP did not recommend the use of special diets for children with autism spectrum disorder because of inadequate evidence.
 Cochrane Library – Gluten and Casein-free diets in autism spectrum disorder (2008) The Cochrane review found that while relatively commonly used the evidence to support the diets use in children with autism was poor. All studies as of 2006 had issues with them.
 Research in Autism Spectrum Disorders – Gluten-free and casein free diets in the treatment of autism spectrum disorders: A systematic review (2009) It concluded that the results "reveal that the current corpus of research does not support the use of GFCF diets in the treatment of ASD. Given the lack of empirical support, and the adverse consequences often associated with GFCF diets (e.g. stigmatization, diversion of treatment resources, reduced bone cortical thickness), such diets should only be implemented in the event a child with ASD experiences acute behavioral changes, seemingly associated with changes in diet and/or a child has allergies or food intolerances to gluten and/or casein."
 Vanderbilt Evidence-based Practice Center – Therapies for Children with Autism Spectrum Disorder (2011) The review, commissioned by the Agency for Healthcare Research and Quality, concluded that, "the evidence supporting GFCF diets in ASD is limited and weak."
 Clinical Therapeutics – The relationship of autism to gluten (2013) This review found one double-blind study, which did not find any benefit from the gluten-free diet, and concluded that "Currently, there is insufficient evidence to support instituting a gluten-free diet as a treatment for autism."
 Journal of Child Neurology – Evidence of the Gluten-Free and Casein-Free Diet in Autism Spectrum Disorders: A Systematic Review (2014) This review found that "...the evidence on this topic is currently limited and weak," and noted that only a few randomized trials had been conducted on the efficacy of gluten-free diets as an autism treatment. The review also noted that even these trials were of questionable scientific merit because they were based on small sample sizes.
 Current Opinion in Clinical Nutrition & Metabolic Care – Gluten-free and casein-free diets in the therapy of autism (2015) This review found "limited and weak" evidence that this diet was effective as a treatment for autism, noting that most studies that had been done to assess its effectiveness were "seriously flawed".
Autism Research Institute – The Autism Research Institute recommends the GFCF/GFDF diet as a treatment for autism and related conditions. The organization believes that, "Dietary intervention is a cornerstone of an evidence-based medical approach, and there is convincing empirical evidence that special diets help many with autism."

Safety
The diet may have a negative effect on bone health, although there is debate over whether this is actually due to the diet or caused by issues associated with autism.

Mechanism
In the 1960s, Curtis Dohan speculated that the low incidence of schizophrenia in certain South Pacific Island societies was a result of a diet low in wheat and milk-based foods. Dohan proposed a genetic defect wherein individuals are incapable of completely metabolizing gluten and casein as a possible cause for schizophrenia. Dohan hypothesized that elevated peptide levels from this incomplete metabolism could be responsible for schizophrenic behaviors. In 1979, Jaak Panksepp proposed a connection between autism and opiates, noting that injections of minute quantities of opiates in young laboratory animals induce symptoms similar to those observed among autistic children.

The possibility of a relationship between autism and the consumption of gluten and casein was first articulated by Kalle Reichelt in 1991. Based on studies showing correlation between autism, schizophrenia, and increased urinary peptide levels, Reichelt hypothesized that some of these peptides may have an opiate effect. This led to the development of the Opioid excess theory, expounded by Paul Shattock and others, which speculates that peptides with opioid activity cross into the bloodstream from the lumen of the intestine, and then into the brain. These peptides were speculated to arise from incomplete digestion of certain foods, in particular gluten from wheat and certain other cereals and from casein from milk and dairy produce. Further work confirmed opioid peptides such as casomorphines (from casein) and gluten exorphines and gliadorphin (from gluten) as possible suspects, due to their chemical similarity to opiates.

Reichelt hypothesized that long term exposure to these opiate peptides may have effects on brain maturation and contribute to social awkwardness and isolation. On this basis, Reichelt and others have proposed a gluten-free casein-free (GFCF) diet for those with autism to minimize the buildup of opiate peptides. Reichelt has also published a number of trials and reviews concluding that this diet is effective.

Practical implementation

The implementation of a GFCF diet involves removing all sources of gluten and casein from a person's diet. Gluten is found in all products containing wheat, rye, and barley. Many gluten-free breads, pastas, and snacks are available commercially. Gluten-free cookbooks have been available for decades. Casein is found in dairy products such as milk, yogurt or cheese, but is also present in smaller amounts in many substitute dairy products such as vegetarian cheese substitutes and whipped cream topping, which use casein to provide texture. Although advocates of the GFCF diet often recommend total elimination of dairy from the diet, whey protein is a different milk protein from casein.

See also 

 Autism therapies
 Gluten-related disorders
 List of alternative therapies for developmental and learning disabilities
 List of diets
 Opioid excess theory

References

External links 
 
 Gluten-Free Diet Consequences

Diets
Autism pseudoscience
Alternative therapies for developmental and learning disabilities
Gluten-free diet